Twelve Mile House

In 1842, The Twelve Mile House was originally built as an inn and tavern for travelers and local residents.

A simple, but imposing building. The Twelve Mile House was built in the Greek Revival Style, which is considered to be the first style to be developed in America. It is particularly noted for its feeling of monumental permanence.

Under various ownership and through 1861, the building continued to serve as a hotel with restaurant and bar until sometime after 1912. The Victorian bar entrance featuring beer mugs in relief on stone pilasters beside the doorway and grapes cut into lintel above is of particular significance in the buildings architectural history and has been retained as a monument to the past.

During the years until 1915, the inn served as a refuge to drivers, who herded cattle and hogs to the stockyards of Cincinnati, and to the haulers, who teamed huge loads of hay to livery stables and horse barns in the city. Throughout Prohibition Days, the inn gained new life as a Road House with dancing, live bands and entertainment. In later years, the original structure as expanded to accommodate additional business.

The Twelve Mile House has served as a landmark through the cultural and population changes within our society. Commercial activity created by its existence has played a significant role in the development of the present city of Sharonville.

Today, this structure has been preserved and will continue to serve the community and its heirs as a landmark of our past and the future.

Twelve Mile House is a registered historic building in Sharonville, Ohio, listed in the National Register on September 1, 1976.

Early Previous Known Owners

David Mills 1842-1854 (built the Inn)

George Metzger 1859 – 1868

Victor Grolle 1869-1890

Frank Knippschild 1890 – 1893

Nick Stegmann 1894 – 1904

Peter Funk 1905 – 1912

Historic uses 
Hotel
Restaurant

Notes 

Houses on the National Register of Historic Places in Ohio
National Register of Historic Places in Hamilton County, Ohio
Houses in Hamilton County, Ohio